The Fun'ambule is a funicular railway in the city of Neuchâtel in the Swiss canton of Neuchâtel. The line runs in tunnel and links the lower part of the town, near the University, to the Neuchâtel railway station in the upper part.

History 
The funicular opened on April 27, 2001.

Operation 
The line has the following parameters:

See also 
 List of funicular railways
 List of funiculars in Switzerland

References 

Funicular railways in Switzerland
Transport in Neuchâtel
Railway lines opened in 2001
5 ft 3 in gauge railways in Switzerland